Società a responsabilità limitata (S.r.l. or srl) is a kind of legal corporate entity in Italy, which literally means (but is not entirely equal to) limited liability company. It has a similar form to società sportiva dilettantistica a responsabilità limitata (S.s.d a r.l.) for amateur sports-related companies and their corresponding regulations: article 90 of the Italian Law №289 of 2002.

Differing from società per azioni (S.p.A.), S.r.l. may not issue shares that have par value, but only the quota or units of the share capital. Moreover, the articles of association of S.r.l. allowed different allocations of profits and assets, which was more comparable to a limited partnership. A fourth form of corporate entity, società cooperativa a responsabilità limitata (S.c.r.l. or S.c. a r.l.), was seen in the cooperatives of Italy.

References

Legal entities
Types of business entity